Pool 2 of the Second Round of the 2013 World Baseball Classic was held at Marlins Park, Miami, Florida, United States from March 12 to 16, 2013.

Pool 2 was a modified double-elimination tournament. The losers of the first two preliminary games (Games 1 and 2) matched up in a third preliminary game (Game 3), which was also an elimination game, while the winners of Games 1 and 2 faced each other in the first of two qualifier games (Game 4). The winner of the elimination game then played the loser of the non-elimination game in the second qualifier game (Game 5), which was another elimination game. The remaining two teams then played each other (in Game 6), to determine seeding for the semifinals of the championship round.

Bracket

Pool 2 MVP:  Robinson Canó

Results
All times are Eastern Daylight Time (UTC−04:00).

Dominican Republic 5, Italy 4

United States 7, Puerto Rico 1

Puerto Rico 4, Italy 3

Italy's early lead in the 5th inning has caused team Puerto Rico to bring themselves closer to elimination until they have managed to ultimately steal the lead from the Italians when the Puerto Rican scored three additional runs from the eighth inning, as the Italian teams struggle to get ahead, only to end up earning themselves two more errors, as Puerto Rico clinched their win over Italy.

Dominican Republic 3, United States 1

Tournament RBI leader and American leader David Wright sat the game out with a sore back. The game was close all the way to the 9th inning. American closer Craig Kimbrel came in for the 9th inning of the 1−1 game, to try to keep the score tied. Erick Aybar drove Cruz in and would later score himself, on a single by José Reyes, as the Dominican Republic would maintain their undefeated record.

MLB Network announcer Tom Verducci, on seeing the jubilant reaction of the Dominican players after they took the lead in the game, said "this is beyond October."

Puerto Rico 4, United States 3

The US team (with David Wright unable to play) and the Puerto Rico team played a second time. Puerto Rico took an early lead in the first inning and stretched the lead further in the sixth inning 4-0. The US struggled to catch up, but J.C. Romero barely managed to stave off from the bases-loaded jam in the eighth inning. The Puerto Rico team defeated the US team, 4-3, so that Puerto Rico qualified as the pool's second team in the championship round, and earning their payback from a 6-5 loss in the 2009 World Baseball Classic.

Dominican Republic 2, Puerto Rico 0

References

External links
Official website

Pool 2
World Baseball Classic Pool 2
2010s in Miami
Baseball competitions in Miami
International baseball competitions hosted by the United States
International sports competitions in Florida
World Baseball Classic Pool 2